Balkány is a town in Hungary.

Balkany may also refer to:

 Balkany (surname)
 Bałkany, Pomeranian Voivodeship, a village in Poland
 Bałkany, the Polish name for the Balkans